North Sikkim (now officially named as Mangan District) is a district of the Indian state of Sikkim. Its district headquarters is Mangan. It is the seventh least populous district in the country (out of 640).

Geography

The district is the largest of the four districts of Sikkim.

The landscape is mountainous with dense vegetation all the way up to the alpine altitude before thinning out to desert scrub towards the northern tundra. Numerous waterfalls astride the main road make the trip to this district extremely picturesque.

The most prominent effect of the steepness of the valleys is the prevalence of landslides that at times drop to anything between 3000 and  carrying devastation along their course. Most of them are caused either by the melting snow beds on top of the mountains or by erosive action of the rains.

Further north the elevation increases with the vegetation turning from temperate to alpine to tundra. Temperatures range from about 25° to below −40° in the extreme high reaches where the altitude is in excess of 6,000 metres. Kanchenjanga is the highest peak at over 8,000 m, straddling its western border with Nepal and can be seen clearly from the town of Singhik.

Assembly Constituencies
Since 2002, the district is divided into 3 assembly constituencies.
 Kabi Lungchok (BL)
 Djongu (BL) 
 Lachen-Mangan(BL)

Economy
Mangan is known as the Large Cardamom Capital of the world. The climate and terrain best suit the cultivation of the larger variety of Cardamom here.

The region has many power projects and enjoys almost uninterrupted electricity. The steep gradient and the innumerable lakes on the higher reaches facilitate ideal conditions for generation of hydro electric power.

In 2006 the Ministry of Panchayati Raj named North Sikkim one of the country's 250 most backward districts (out of a total of 640). It is the only district in Sikkim currently receiving funds from the Backward Regions Grant Fund Programme (BRGF).

Tourism
Most of North Sikkim is restricted to travellers and permits are needed to visit these areas. The area, which shares a sensitive border with the People's Republic of China is heavily patrolled by the Indian army. However, in view of exquisite scenic beauty, a large number of tourists have started visiting the region overcoming all sorts of hardship. Often unregulated tourism becomes a major conservation issue in fragile ecosystem such as high mountains.

Divisions

Administrative divisions
  

North Sikkim is divided into two sub-divisions:

Demographics
According to the 2011 census Mangan district has a population of 43,709, roughly equal to the nation of Liechtenstein. This gives it a ranking of 634th in India (out of a total of 640). Its population growth rate over the decade 2001–2011 was 5.66%. North Sikkim has a sex ratio of 769 females for every 1000 males, and a literacy rate of 77.39%.

The people are mainly of Lepcha and Bhutia descent. Other groups include the Tibetan community. It also has one of the lowest populated regions of the state.

Religion

Buddhism is followed by majority of the people in Mangan district. Hinduism followed by a considerable population.

Languages

At the time of the 2011 Census of India, 31.71% of the population in the district spoke Lepcha, 23.24% Nepali, 14.41% Sikkimese, 8.51% Limbu, 6.40% Hindi, 3.63% Sherpa, 2.56% Tamang, 1.75% Punjabi, 1.62% Bhojpuri, 1.22% Rai and 1.08% Bengali as their first language.

Transport
Roads are in a poor condition owing to the frequent landslides.

Flora and fauna
North Sikkim is home to the red panda (Ailurus fulgens), a vulnerable species. This animal is the pride of Sikkim and is also the State Animal. It is generally found between heights of 2000 m to 4000 m. It is as big as a domestic Siamese cat (approximately 2 ft long), has a triangular shaped face with a stripe on its cheek, with red fur and black eyes. It has a sprinkling of white on its back and chest. The tail is bushy, black or brown in colour and long like that of a skunk. They generally live on treetops.

It shares the park with West Sikkim district.

Important Towns and Cities
Mangan
Chungthang
Lachen
Lachung
Phodong
Dikchu

Banking Facilities
The following Banks provide banking facilities in North Sikkim, district of Sikkim:

Axis Bank, Lachen
Central Bank of India, Mangan
Canara Bank, Mangan
IDBI Bank, Mangan
State Bank Of India, Chungthang
State Bank Of India, Mangan
State Bank Of India, Kabi Sab
State Bank Of India, Lachung
State Bank Of India, Phodong
State Bank Of India, Dikchu
Union Bank of India, Mangan
Uco Bank, Mangan

References

External links

 

 

 
Districts of Sikkim